Nana: A Tale of Us is a 2017 Indian Nagamese-language drama film directed by Tiakümzük Aier and produced by Aoyimti Youth Ministry. The film stars Zhokhoi Chüzho, Mengu Süokhrie, Watipongla Kichü, Ariensa Longchar and Bokavi Swü.

With a production budget of 2.5 million or 25 lakhs, it was the most expensive Naga film to be produced at the time of its release. Upon its release on 18 July 2017, Nana: A Tale of Us achieved critical and commercial success in the state.

Premise

Cast

Main
 Zhokhoi Chüzho as Malay, Nana's father
 Mengu Süokhrie as Ano, Nana's mother
 Watipongla Kichü as Nana

Supporting
 Imkong Longchar as Ato, Nana's maternal Uncle
 Ariensa Longchar as Thiru
 Bokavi Swü as Dr. Ramok
 Imnasenla Aier as Miss Grace, Ato's love interest
 Chubatemjen as Mr. Thensa, Miss Grace's father
 Alfrit Chishi as Mad Man

Production

Filming
The film took 11 months to complete. It took 15 days to shoot. The whole crew stayed at Impur Mission Centre and the major portion was shot at Süngratsü village. The rest was shot at Mopungchuket village and Mokokchung.

Soundtrack
The background score is composed by Akok Imsong, Atsa Lang Roths and Along Longchar.

The song titled ‘Something New’ performed by Jonathan Yhome is the theme song of the film.

Release
The trailer of the film was released on 9 April 2017 and the film was released on 18 July 2017. In February 2021, Aoyimti Youth Ministry released the film on the YouTube platform.

Reception

Critical response
Film Critic Dr. Piyush said that the film is one of the Finest Films to come out of India this year.

Awards and nominations

References

External links
 
 Nana: A Tale of Us on YouTube

Naga films
Films set in Nagaland
Films shot in Nagaland
Nagamese-language films